The Argentina national U-17 football team is the representative of Argentina within all FIFA sponsored tournaments that pertain to that age level.

Argentina has participated in 14 of the 18 FIFA U-17 World Cups in which they finished in Third Place 3 times and Fourth Place twice. Argentina has also won the South American Under-17 Football Championship 4 times.

Many of Argentina's top players came through the ranks of the U-17 teams, including  Fernando Redondo, Nestor Fabbri, Roberto Bonano, Juan Sebastián Verón, Roberto Abbondanzieri, Franco Constanzo, Leonardo Biagini, Luciano Galletti, Marcelo Gallardo, Esteban Cambiasso, Gabriel Milito, Ezequiel González, Aldo Duscher, Lucas Biglia, Eduardo Salvio, Maxi López, Rodolfo Arruabarrena, Javier Mascherano and Carlos Tevez among others.

Honours

Competitive
FIFA U-17 World Cup
  Third Place (3): 1991, 1995, 2003
 Fourth Place (2): 2001, 2013

South American Championship U-17
 Champions (4): 1985, 2003, 2013, 2019
  Runners-up (6): 1988, 1995, 1997, 2001, 2009, 2015
  Third Place (4): 1991, 1993, 2007, 2011
 Fourth Place (2): 1986, 1999

Competitive record

FIFA U-17 World Cup

South American U-17 Championship

1Draws include knockout matches decided on penalty kicks.

Current squad
The following players were selected to compete in the 2019 South American U-17 Championship.

Manager:  Pablo Aimar

References

South American national under-17 association football teams
Argentina national football team